2WO is the second studio album by Canadian new wave band Strange Advance released in February, 1985.  It featured two hit Canadian singles, "We Run" and "The Second That I Saw You".  Along with their first album, this was a Canadian gold record for the band.

Background and writing
This recording features heavy use of keyboards and synthesizers including the Fairlight, Yamaha DX7, and Jupiter 8.

Recalling the inspiration behind the hit song "We Run", Drew Arnott said it was "one of those 'wake up sweating' dreams.  I just described what I saw.  The smallest things can be the most inspiring. Ed Shaw added a delay to a sound in "We Run" which made the whole track come alive for me.  Major bow to Michael Kamen for the strings and Scott Litt (REM) for the mix."

One song written during the 2WO sessions but left off the record was "Lady with a Blade", which would later appear on the 1995 compilation album Worlds Away & Back.

Critical reception

Tomas Mureika of allmusic calls 2WO "A seriously overlooked album".

Track listing

Album credits

Personnel
 Darryl Kromm – lead vocals, guitar
 Drew Arnott – keyboards, drums, vocals, lead vocal on "We Run"

with:

 Ken "Spider" Sinnaeve – bass
 Gerald O'Brien – keyboards and arrangement assistance
 Howard Ayee – bass on "We Run", "The Second That I Saw You"
 Dawnlee Tait – backing vocals
 Andy Bown – 12 string guitar; bass on "Running Away"
 Ed Shaw – guitar
 Andy Newmark – drums on "Running Away"
 Earl Slick – guitar on "Running Away"
 David Roberts – backing vocals
 Steve Sexton – keyboards on "We Run"
 Keith Scott – guitars
 Chitose Ishikura – Japanese voiceover on "The Second That I Saw You"
 Chris Arnott – Gaelic voiceover
 Kevin Markland – percussion
 Laura Oldham – slapstick
 Michael Kamen – oboe, keyboards, vocal effect on "I'll Be the One to Cry"
 Domenic Troiano – guitar on "The Second That I Saw You"
 Tony Lester – guitar
 Simon Brierley – lead guitar
 John Jones – piano
 Ericka Goodman – harp
 Bernie LaBarge – backing vocals
 John Forbes, Jean Piche, Dee Long, Drew Arnott – Fairlight programming

Production
 Drew Arnott –– producer
 Michael Kamen – producer of "Nor Crystal Tears", string arrangements on "We Run"
 Remixing – Scott Litt; Drew Arnott & Lenny DeRose on "Nor Crystal Tears"
 Engineering – Lenny DeRose, Andy Jackson, Dave Oglivie, Dee Long, Scott Litt
 Mastering – Bob Ludwig, Masterdisk, New York

References
Citations

Other

 

1985 albums
Strange Advance albums
Capitol Records albums